The Loch of Boardhouse is a freshwater loch in the parish of Birsay in the north west of the mainland of Orkney, Scotland. It acts as a reservoir for public water supply and is popular for trout fishing. Nearby are the Loch of Hundland and the Loch of Swannay.

The loch was surveyed in 1906 by Sir John Murray and later charted as part of the Bathymetrical Survey of Fresh-Water Lochs of Scotland 1897-1909.

References

Boardhouse
Boardhouse
Boardhouse
Mainland, Orkney